Theodor Kroyer (9 September 1873 – 12 January 1945) was a German musicologist.

Life 
Kroyer was born in Munich. After he won his Abitur in 1893 at the Wilhelmsgymnasium (Munich) he studied at the University of Munich and at the Akademie für Tonkunst in Munich. He received his doctorate in 1897 and habilitated in 1902 at the University of Munich, where he taught from 1907 as a non-permanent associate professor.

From 1920 to 1923 he was professor of musicology at the Ruprecht-Karls-Universität Heidelberg, where he devoted himself particularly to the study of early music. He was then full professor of music at the University of Leipzig, where he was instrumental in establishing the Museum of Musical Instruments. In 1932 he became professor for musicology at the University of Cologne, where he worked until his retirement in 1938. He founded the musicological series  and was editor of the first three volumes. In the series  he was responsible for the volume about Ludwig Senfl. His edition of the study score of Mozart's Haffner-Sinfonie is still in use today. He wrote biographies of Josef Rheinberger and Walter Courvoisier. Among his students were Karl Laux, Eugen Schmitz, Hans von Benda, Heinrich Strobel and Wolfgang Fortner.

Kroyer died in Wiesbaden at age 71.

Publications 
 Publikationen älterer Musik.
 Walter Courvoisier. Mit einem Bildnis und vielen Notenbeispielen. 
 Die Anfänge der Chromatik im italienischen Madrigal des XVI. Jahrhunderts ... Inaugural-Dissertation ... von Theodor Kroyer.
 Publikationen älterer Musik. Veröffentlicht von der Abteilung zur Herausgabe älterer Musik bei der Deutschen Musikgesellschaft. Für die Leitung: Theodor Kroyer. 11 Jahr.
 Theodor Kroyer-Festschrift zum sechzigsten Geburtstag am 9. September 1933
 Die Anfange der Chromatik im italienischen Madrigal des XVI. Jahrhunderts. Ein Beitrag zur Geschichte des Madrigals.
 Ludwig Senfls Werke Eingeleitet u. hrsg. von Theodor Kroyer.

Literature 
 Thomas Phleps: Ein stiller, verbissener und zäher Kampf um Stetigkeit – Musikwissenschaft in NS-Deutschland und ihre vergangenheitspolitische Bewältigung, in Isolde v. Foerster et al. (ed.),  Musikforschung – Nationalsozialismus – Faschismus, Mainz 2001, . online Uni Giessen

References

External links 
 
 Kroyer_88Prof. Dr. phil. Theodor Kroyer on 
 Nachlass in der Bayerischen Staatsbibliothek

20th-century German musicologists
Academic staff of Heidelberg University
Academic staff of the University of Cologne
Academic staff of the Ludwig Maximilian University of Munich
Academic staff of Leipzig University
1873 births
1945 deaths
Writers from Munich